Territoriality is a term associated with nonverbal communication that refers to how people use space (territory) to communicate ownership or occupancy of areas and possessions. The anthropological concept branches from the observations of animal ownership behaviors.  Personal space can be regarded as a bubble with a person at the center, forming an area which the person does not wish to be invaded.

An example of demonstrating territoriality might be the car size. Driving a large truck like the Ford F-450 might be communicating that a value of owning a lot of space on the highway. However, driving a small car like the Smart, then might be communicating no need to occupy so much space. Another example is students as they sit in class. Some students like to spread their backpack and books out in a way to let other students know that they do not want others to sit next to them. These students seem to value having a lot of space to themselves. On the other hand, some students keep their books and bags close to them, making others aware that they have no problem in sharing space with other students.

The term stimulated Edward T. Hall to create the word proxemics, which refers to how people use space, but not necessarily how people communicate ownership .

In nation-states
Territoriality can also be associated with nation-states.  Government and social ideas are also associated with territoriality.  A nation-state can establish common ideals amongst its citizens which lead to territoriality. Nationalism is an example of this. National pride, common religious practices, and politics all play a role in a state's territoriality.

An example of this would be the conflict in Northern Ireland. The island of Ireland as a whole and the Republic of Ireland (which has the majority of the island's area and residents) both have Catholic majorities while the United Kingdom and Northern Ireland (which is a part of the UK and constitutes less than half of the island of Ireland's area and residents) both have Protestant majorities. Many Irish people in both Northern Ireland and the Republic of Ireland don't want Northern Ireland to be a part of a nation that is not Catholic-majority, since Catholicism is the religion of the majority of the Irish nation and the religion of the majority of people on the island of Ireland. Territorial disputes in Northern Ireland have been justified by religion. This is an example of how religion can play a strong role in territoriality.

Behavioural models 
In the postwar era human territoriality was commonly believed to be the product of human instinct, akin or analogous to territorial behaviour in animals.

Social models 
Since the 1980s, human territoriality has been instead studied as the product of sociopolitical processes. Robert Sack's 'Human Territoriality' popularised this position, describing human territoriality as a powerful strategy. In the field of International Relations, John Ruggie argued that territoriality was the organizing principle for modern international politics and could be contrasted with medieval heteronomous orders. Following Ruggie, a number of works have sought to explain how territoriality became the dominant principle of European international relations and/or question his broadly Westphalian chronology of the modern territorial order.

According to author Julia T. Wood, "men go into women's spaces more than women enter men's spaces" . With this in mind, we can understand that men typically have a stronger sense of ownership and are more likely to challenge others' boundaries. People respond to invasion of territory in different ways depending on what their comfort norms are. Wood (2007) presents three common responses:

 When someone moves too close for comfort, you might step away, giving up your territory. This reaction is typical of feminine people. 
 When people have to fit into close spaces, they often look down as a submissive way of showing that they are not trying to invade others' territories.
 When someone moves too close, you might refuse to give up your territory. This reaction is typical of masculine people.

See also 
 Signalling (economics)
 Spraying (animal behavior) (territorial marking)
 Territory (animal)
 Territory (disambiguation)
Phrynus longipes#Territoriality

References

 
 

 Storey, David (2017). Territory and Territoriality. Oxford Bibliographies.

Nonverbal communication